Maccabi Herzliya F.C. (Moadon Kaduregel Maccabi Herzliya) is an Israeli football club based in Herzliya.

History
A football section of the Maccabi Herzliya Sports Club existed and played several matches since 1929, including competing in the 1930 Palestine Cup. The club was formally established in 1932. In 1978 they were promoted to Liga Artzit (then the second tier). However, they finished bottom in the 1980–81 season and were relegated back to Liga Alef. In 1983 they moved to the Herzliya Municipal Stadium, which they share with city rivals Hapoel Herzliya.

At the start of the 1990s the club returned to Liga Artzit, and were promoted to Liga Leumit (then the top division) for the first time in their history in 1992–93 as Artzit champions. They avoided relegation by a single point in 1994–95, and finished one place above the relegation zone again in 1996–97 and 1998–99. In the first season of the new Premier League in 1999–2000, they finished second bottom and were relegated.

In 2001–02 they finished third, narrowly missing out on promotion back to the Premier League. In 2005, they reached the State Cup final for the first time, losing to Maccabi Tel Aviv on penalties after a 2–2 draw. In 2005–06 they won Liga Leumit (now the second tier) to return to the top division. After finishing one place above the relegation zone in the 2006–07 season, In the 2007–08 season they finished bottom and relegated back to Liga Leumit.

Current squad
 As to 4 February 2023

Honours
Toto Cup
Winners 2007
Second Division
Champions 1992–93, 2005–06

Notable managers

 Eli Cohen (born 1951)
Gili Landau (born 1958)

References

External links
Official Website (Hebrew)

 
Herzliya F.C
Association football clubs established in 1932
Herzliya F.C
1932 establishments in Mandatory Palestine
Sport in Herzliya
Organizations based in Herzliya